YDM may refer to:

 Ross River Airport
 The year-day-month format for calendar dates